The 1969 WCHA men's ice hockey tournament was the 10th conference playoff in league history. The tournament was played between March 6 and March 8, 1969. All East Regional games were played at the Weinberg Coliseum in Ann Arbor, Michigan while West Regional games were held at the DU Arena in Denver, Colorado. By winning the regional tournaments, both the East Regional Champion†, Michigan Tech, and West Regional Champion‡, Denver, were invited to participate in the 1969 NCAA University Division men's ice hockey tournament.

Format
All member teams in the WCHA were eligible for the tournament and were seeded No. 1 through No. 8 according to the final conference standings. The eight teams were then divided into two separate groups by placing all three teams from Michigan in the east region, held at the Weinberg Coliseum, and all teams west of Minnesota were placed in the west region, held at the DU Arena. The remaining two Minnesota-based universities were divided so that Minnesota went into the east region and Minnesota-Duluth went into the west region. Once each regional group was set the teams were reseeded No. 1 to No. 4 according to their final conference standings. In the Second round the first and fourth seeds and the second and third seeds in each region were matched in a single game with the winners advancing to their regional final games. The winners of the two championship games were declared as co-conference tournament champions.

Conference standings
Note: GP = Games played; W = Wins; L = Losses; T = Ties; PCT = Winning percentage; GF = Goals for; GA = Goals against

Bracket

Note: * denotes overtime period(s)

East Regional

Semifinals

(1) Michigan Tech vs. (4) Michigan State

(2) Michigan vs. (3) Minnesota

Finals

(1) Michigan Tech vs. (2) Michigan

West Regional

Semifinals

(1) Denver vs. (4) Minnesota-Duluth

(2) North Dakota vs. (3) Colorado College

Finals

(1) Denver vs. (3) Colorado College

Tournament awards
None

See also
Western Collegiate Hockey Association men's champions

References

External links
WCHA.com
1968–69 WCHA Standings
1968–69 NCAA Standings
2013–14 Colorado College Tigers Media Guide
2013–14 Denver Pioneers Media Guide
2013–14 Michigan Wolverines Media Guide; Through the Years
2013–14 Michigan State Spartans Media Guide; Section 5
2013–14 Minnesota Golden Gophers Media Guide 
2012–13 Minnesota-Duluth Bulldogs Media Guide
2013–14 North Dakota Hockey Media Guide

WCHA Men's Ice Hockey Tournament
Wcha men's ice hockey tournament